Stephen Ryan (born 6 July 1970) is a former Australian rules football player who played in the Australian Football League (AFL) between 1990 and 1993 for the Richmond Football Club and in 1994 for the Collingwood Football Club. He is the brother of fellow former Richmond player Des Ryan and the uncle of NBL players Aaron and Shaun Bruce.

References 

 Hogan P: The Tigers Of Old, Richmond FC, Melbourne 1996

External links 

Australian rules footballers from Victoria (Australia)
Richmond Football Club players
Collingwood Football Club players
Living people
1970 births
People educated at Melbourne High School